Ravneet Gill (born April 1991) is a British pastry chef, author of The Pastry Chef's Guide, activist and television presenter. In 2020 Gill replaced Prue Leith to work as the judge on Junior Bake Off alongside Liam Charles and Harry Hill. She is founder and director of Countertalk - a job service and community that promotes healthy work environments in the food industry Gill is a food columnist for The Guardian "Feast" supplement and The Daily Telegraph food supplement. She was named in CODE Quarterly's spring 2019 list of most influential women in hospitality.

Career
After studying Psychology at the University of Southampton then at Le Cordon Bleu she worked as pastry chef at St. JOHN before founding Countertalk.

Filmography

References

External links
 
 https://www.instagram.com/ravneeteats/
 https://countertalk.co.uk/
 https://www.ravneetgill.com/

1991 births
Living people
British television presenters
British Sikhs
Women chefs
English television chefs
British philanthropists
21st-century philanthropists